Lake Francis State Park is a public recreation area located on Lake Francis in the town of Pittsburg, New Hampshire. The state park has a boat launch, visitor center, and playground and offers opportunities for  fishing, canoeing on the reservoir and upper part of the Connecticut River, ATV riding, camping, and snow sports.

The park saw its genesis with the transfer in 1976 of 17 acres of land on Lake Francis from the New Hampshire Water Resources Board to the Department of Resources and Economic Development.

The park is 1 of 10 New Hampshire state parks that are in the path of totality for the 2024 solar eclipse, with 3 minutes and 14 seconds of totality.

References

External links 
 Lake Francis State Park New Hampshire Department of Natural and Cultural Resources

State parks of New Hampshire
Parks in Coös County, New Hampshire
Pittsburg, New Hampshire